The Iprari church of the Archangels, or Tarngzel as it is locally known, is an 11th-century church at the outskirts of the eponymous village in the Mestia Municipality in Georgia's region of Samegrelo-Zemo Svaneti. The village is part of the highland historical and cultural region of Svaneti. Architecturally an unremarkable hall church, Iprari contains a set of frescoes painted by Tevdore in 1096, one of the high points of medieval Georgian monumental art. The church is inscribed on the list of the Immovable Cultural Monuments of National Significance of Georgia.

Architecture 
Iprari is a small and simple rectangular edifice with the dimensions of 4.75 × 2.6 m2, ending in an apse to the east. The church is built of well-hewn yellowish pumice square blocks. Facades are simple, decoration-poor. The only entrance is located on the west. The interior is lit by two windows, one in the apse and the other above the entrance. The altar is separated from the hall by a stone altar screen, with three arched openings. The walls of the church are plain, without much architectural treatment; brackets are used to support arches on the longitudinal walls. The interior walls contain a number of scratched memorial graffiti, dating from the 11th to the 15th century.

Frescoes 

Architecturally unremarkable, the interior of the Iprari church preserves high-quality murals commissioned by the local community from the "royal painter" Tevdore in 1096, as reported by a Georgian inscription on the altar screen. This Tevdore is also known to have frescoed two other churches in Svaneti: the Lagurka church of Saints Cyricus and Julitta in 1112 and the Nakipari church of St. George in 1130. 

The frescoes are organized so as to follow the architectural features of the interior; various ornamental motifs are used to frame and demarcate the mural compositions. Scenes in the conch of the apse depict, in the upper and lower tiers, respectively, the Deesis and a group of church hierarchs flanked by two burning candelabra. The altar screen contains depictions of Sts. Cyricus and Julitta, Demetrius of Thessaloniki, and Stephen. The frescoes on the walls and ceiling are also arranged in two tiers, depicting the baptism of Jesus, the equestrian Saint George, the archangel Michael and Joshua, kneeling down before him, on the northern wall and the nativity of Jesus, the archangel Gabriel, the equestrian Theodore Stratelates, the Virgin Nicopeia, and Saint Anne on the southern wall. 

The western wall contains the frescoes of the Annunciation and Sts. Barbara and Catherine. The exterior of the southern facade, facing the village, was also completely frescoed—a feature characteristic for the medieval Svanetian churches—by an unknown local painter of the 12th century. These murals—depicting the Deesis and Saint Eustace's hunting scene—have largely faded.

Icons 

Like many other medieval churches in Svaneti, the Iprari church—owing to its remoteness—served as a safe repository of pieces of Christian art. Touring the region in 1910, the Georgian scholar Ekvtime Taqaishvili reported at least a dozen of old church items, including a now-lost 13th-century triptych of the Virgin and Child, which also depicted the ktitor David, apparently King David VII of Georgia, as suggested by mentioning David and his wife Gvantsa in another inscription on the icon. Preserved in the iconostasis of Iprari is the 12th–13th century icon depicting the archangel Michael and the Deesis.

Notes

References 

Buildings and structures in Samegrelo-Zemo Svaneti
Immovable Cultural Monuments of National Significance of Georgia
Georgian Orthodox churches in Georgia (country)
11th-century Eastern Orthodox church buildings
Svaneti